The Mbahaam–Iha languages are a pair of Papuan languages spoken on the Bomberai Peninsula of western New Guinea.
The two languages, Baham (Mbaham) and Iha, are closely related to each other.

Proto-language

Phonemes
Usher (2020) reconstructs the consonant and vowel inventories as:

{| 
| *m || *n ||  ||  || 
|-
| *p || *t ||  || *k || *kʷ
|-
| *mb || *nd ||  || *ŋg || *ŋgʷ
|-
|  || *s ||  ||  || 
|-
| *w || *r || *j ||  || 
|}

Prenasalized plosives do not occur initially, having merged with the voiceless plosives.

The vowels are *i *u *ɛ *ɔ *a and the diphthongs *iɛ *ɛi.

Pronouns
Usher (2020) reconstructs the free pronouns as:

{| 
! !!sg!!pl
|-
!1excl
|rowspan=2|*[a/ɔ]n|| [*mbi]
|-
!1incl
| *in
|-
!2
|*k[a/ɔ]||*ki
|-
!3
|*m[a/ɔ]||*mi, *wat
|}

Basic vocabulary
Some lexical reconstructions by Usher (2020) are:

{| class="wikitable sortable"
! gloss !! Proto-Mbahaam-Iha !! Mbahaam !! Iha
|-
! head
| *kaˈnda || kndaː || kanda
|-
! ear
| *kʷⁱɛr || kpʷujɛr || pɛr
|-
! eye
|  || k(i)jɛp || kɛndɛp
|-
! blood
| *wⁱɛk || wijɛk || wɛk
|-
! bone
| *ˈtɔkar || tɔ(ː)qar || tɔqar
|-
! skin
| *pak || paːk || pak
|-
! breast
| *sɔn || sɔːn || hɔn ~ sɔn
|-
! louse
| *mɛⁱn || miːn || mɛin
|-
! dog
| *jaˈmbar || jambaːr || mbiar
|-
! pig
| *[ku]ˈndur || kunduːr || ndur
|-
! egg
| *wun || uːn || wun
|-
! tree
| *wiˈra || wurʲaː ~ wɛrʲaː || wɛrɛ ~ wrɛ
|-
! man/male
| *nami-sar || nami-ha || nɛmɛ-har
|-
! woman/female
| *t[ɔ/u]mb[ɔ/u]r || tumbu- || (tɔ-)tɔmbɔr
|-
! sun
| *kaˈminV || kamiːni || kimina
|-
! moon
| *kaˈpas || kabaːs || kabah
|-
! water
| *kiˈra || krija || kara
|-
! stone
| *war || waːr || war
|-
! name
| *nⁱɛ || nʲiɛ || nɛ
|-
! eat
| *nawa || nɔwa || nɔwa ~ nawa-
|-
! one
| *ɔkʷɔ[nɔ] || ɔqɔnɔ || pɔ
|}

Protoforms of the 20 most-stable items in the Swadesh list include the following.

{| class="wikitable sortable"
! gloss !! Proto-Mbahaam–Iha
|-
| *mɛin || louse 
|- 
| ? || two 
|- 
| *kiˈra || water 
|- 
| *kʷiɛr || ear 
|- 
| *kimi || die 
|- 
| *[a/ɔ]n || I 
|- 
| ? || liver 
|- 
| ? (k(i)jɛp / kɛndɛp) || eye 
|- 
| *tan || hand 
|- 
| *kɔmɛn || hear 
|- 
| *wiˈra, aˈtɔkʷ || tree, tree/wood
|- 
| *ˈsɛjir || fish 
|- 
| *niɛ || name 
|- 
| *war || stone 
|- 
| ? || tooth 
|- 
| *sɔn || breast 
|- 
| *k[a/ɔ] || you 
|- 
| ? || path 
|- 
| *ˈtɔkar || bone 
|- 
| ? || tongue (*mak voice/language)
|}

References 

Usher, Timothy and Antoinette Schapper, 2018. "The lexicons of the Papuan languages of the Onin Peninsula and their influences". In Antoinette Schapper, ed. Contact and substrate in the languages of Wallacea part 2. NUSA 64: 3963.

External links 
 Timothy Usher, New Guinea World, Proto–Mbahaam–Iha

Languages of Indonesia
West Bomberai languages